Karepa is a village in Haljala Parish, Lääne-Viru County, in northeastern Estonia.

Painter Richard Sagrits (1910–1968) was born in Karepa. His house-museum is located in the village.

Literary scientist Villem Alttoa (1898–1975) was also born in Karepa. Writer Villem Gross and artist Valli Lember-Bogatkina both had their summer homes at village.

References

Villages in Lääne-Viru County